Glynne  may refer to one of the following.

Glynne baronets
Stephen Glynne (disambiguation)
William Glynne (disambiguation)
 Jess Glynne
John Glynne (disambiguation)
Mary Glynne

See also
 Glinn (disambiguation)
 Glynn (disambiguation) 
 Glyn (disambiguation)